Saphenista paraconsona is a species of moth of the family Tortricidae. It is found in Minas Gerais, Brazil.

The wingspan is about 10 mm. The ground colour of the forewings is glossy creamy with pinkish dots. The base of the wing is suffused with pale brownish olive, the termen is more pinkish. The hindwings are grey brown.

References

Moths described in 2002
Saphenista